Salaakhen is a 1975 Hindi movie produced by Parvesh Mehra and directed by A. Salaam. The film stars Shashi Kapoor, Sulakshana Pandit, A. K. Hangal, Mehmood, Amrish Puri and Ramesh Deo. The film's music is by Ravindra Jain. The rights to this film are owned by Shah Rukh Khan's Red Chillies Entertainment.

Plot
Raju (Shashi Kapoor) and Guddi (Sulakshana Pandit) are childhood friends and neighbors, who are virtually inseparable. Raju's father is arrested after a dramatic police chase for breaking, entering and theft, resulting in their separation. Guddi grows up to be a professional stage singer and dancer, while Raju grows up to be a card-sharp and a thief. Years later, both Raju (now called Chander) and Guddi (now called Seema) meet and fall in love with each other, unaware that they were childhood friends. While Seema is on her way to her birthplace for religious reasons, Chander too is headed that way, to get himself arrested so that he can be jailed for a motive, that gets him a hefty sum of money from a gangster.

Cast
 
Shashi Kapoor - Raju/Chander
Sulakshana Pandit - Guddi/Seema
Goga Kapoor - Casino Owner
Sajjan - Ram Lal, Seema's father
Mehmood - Abdul Rehman
Amrish Puri - Master
Anjana Mumtaz - Farida
Ramesh Deo - Gautam
Pinchoo Kapoor - Haridas, Rich Man
Mac Mohan - Prince
Moolchand - Shopkeeper
Shivraj - Advani
Sudhir - Inspector Ahmed
Shammi Kapoor - Truck Driver
Ramesh Deo - Gautam
Brahm Bhardwaj - Insurance Company Manager
Keshto Mukherjee - Qaidi No. 840
V. Gopal - Qaidi No. 420
Master Ratan - Young Raju
Uma Dutt - Police Inspector
Birbal - David
Tarun Ghosh - Police Inspector
P.Jairaj - Jailor

Crew
Director - A. Salaam
Producer - Parvesh C. Mehra
Music Director - Ravindra Jain
Lyricist - Dev Kohli, Hasrat Jaipuri, Ravindra Jain
Playback Singers - Asha Bhosle, Hemlata, Kishore Kumar, Sulakshana Pandit

Music
Song "Seema Seema Seema" was listed at #29 on Binaca Geetmala annual list 1976

External links 
 

1975 films
1970s Hindi-language films
Films scored by Ravindra Jain